Anton Down-Jenkins (born 6 September 1999) is a New Zealand Olympic diver who competed at the 2020 Summer Olympics.

Down-Jenkins got his Olympic quota for individual 3 m springboard at the 2021 Diving World Cup, Olympic Qualification Event, held in Tokyo, in May 2021. The Wellingtonian, who competes in the 3m springboard, placed 10th at the event, New Zealand's best ever finish at a Diving World Cup.

He competed in the individual 3m springboard event at the 2020 Summer Olympics in Tokyo, becoming the first male diver to compete for New Zealand at the Olympics since 1984. He is the first New Zealand diver to qualify for an Olympic final, finishing 8th out of 12 divers, from an original field of 29 in the competition.

Down-Jenkins represented New Zealand at the Gold Coast 2018 Commonwealth Games where he placed 8th in the 3m syncronised and 14th in the individual 3m springboard.

Down-Jenkins is Māori; his iwi affiliation is Te Arawa.

He is now based at the University of North Carolina. He is openly part of the LGBTQIA+ community and identifies as gay.

References

External links
 

Living people
1999 births
New Zealand male divers
Sportspeople from Wellington City
Divers at the 2018 Commonwealth Games
Commonwealth Games competitors for New Zealand
North Carolina Tar Heels athletes
New Zealand expatriate sportspeople in the United States
Gay sportsmen
New Zealand LGBT sportspeople
Olympic divers of New Zealand
Divers at the 2020 Summer Olympics
21st-century New Zealand LGBT people
20th-century New Zealand people
21st-century New Zealand people